Øvre Dividal National Park is a national park in Målselv Municipality in Troms county, Norway. The original intention was to preserve a very little disturbed inland valley and mountain area. The hiking trail Nordkalottruta passes through the national park.

Name
The first element in the name Dividal is from the river name Divielva (literally Divi River). Divi is form the Northern Sami language word dievvá which means 'round and dry hill'.  The last element is from the Norwegian language word dal which means 'dale' or 'valley'. The word øvre means 'upper' in Norwegian, thus 'the upper part of Dividal'.

Nature

Flora

Pine forests at the lowest elevations give way to mountain birch higher up, and finally willow and dwarf birch on the open alpine tundra. Some grey alder (Alnus incana) grows along the Divi river. A total of 315 plant species have been recorded. Rhododendron (Rhododendron lapponicum) grows naturally in the area.

Fauna
All large predators on the mainland are represented in the park (brown bear, wolf, wolverine, lynx), although wolf is rare and probably has no permanent presence. The wolverine is especially numerous in this area. Reindeer (Sami-owned) are common, as are moose, and  the Arctic fox used to be living in the area.

Climate

There is no permafrost in the lower elevations of the park. At altitudes above , permafrost is common. Together with areas in bordering Sweden, as well as almost undisturbed areas nearby in Norway, this park is part of a larger wilderness area.

Geology
The bedrock consists of conglomerate, sandstone and slate. Several rivers have carved ravines. A peculiarity is large rocks placed at unlikely locations. These were carried by the ice-age glaciers, and deposited randomly at the end of the ice age.

References

External links

English language information about Øvre-Dividal-National park
Unep: About Øvre Dividal National Park

National parks of Norway
Protected areas established in 1971
Protected areas of Troms og Finnmark
Tourist attractions in Troms og Finnmark
1971 establishments in Norway
Målselv